Hicklin is a surname. Notable people with the surname include:

Aaron Hicklin, American magazine editor
Ashley Hicklin (born 1985), English singer-songwriter
Barbara Roe Hicklin (1918–2010), Canadian painter
Benjamin Hicklin (1818–1909), English solicitor and mayor
Edwin Richley Hicklin (1895–1963), American judge and politician

See also
Hicklin test, a legal test